East Orchard is a small village and parish in the county of Dorset in southern England. It lies in the Blackmore Vale within the North Dorset administrative district. It is situated roughly midway between the hilltop town of Shaftesbury and the riverside town of Sturminster Newton. It is separated from the neighbouring village of West Orchard by a small stream. In 2013 the estimated population of the civil parish was 100. For local government purposes the parish is grouped with the parishes of West Orchard and Margaret Marsh, to form a Group Parish Council.

The Orchard ("Horcerd") listed in the Domesday Book of 1086, is more likely to refer to "Orchard" near Church Knowle on Purbeck, rather than East and West Orchard.

References

External links 

Villages in Dorset
Civil parishes in Dorset